The National University of Litoral (UNL) is a public university in Argentina. It is based in Santa Fe, the capital of Santa Fe Province. It has colleges and other academic facilities in Esperanza, Reconquista and Gálvez, also in Santa Fe Province.

History
The original institution was established as the Universidad Provincial de Santa Fe (Provincial University of Santa Fe) in 1889. The Argentine university reform of 1918 brought modernization and democratization to higher education in Argentina. The National University of Litoral was created the following year by a national law signed on October 17, becoming the first regional university in the country, with influence over the Argentine Littoral (Santa Fe and the Mesopotamic provinces of Entre Ríos and Corrientes).

Notable alumni
Jorge Goldenberg - San Martín, Buenos Aires. Screenwriter.
Juan José Saer - Serodino. Novelist.
Miguel Brascó - Sastre, Santa Fe. Writer, humorist, critic.
Alberto Cassano - Carmen de Patagones. Engineer, professor. Founded the scientific program CONICET. 
Eugenio Raúl Zaffaroni - Buenos Aires. Judge of Inter-American Court of Human Rights.
Ricardo Lorenzetti - Rafaela. Judge. President of Supreme Court of Argentina.
Horacio Rossatti - Santa Fe, Argentina. Lawyer. Former Mayor of the City of Santa Fé. Currently, President of the Supreme Court of Argentina.
Rogelio Pfirter - Santa Fe, Argentina. Diplomat. OPAQ director 2002–2010.
Jorge Faurie - Santa Fe, Argentina. Diplomat. Former chancellor at the Ministry of Foreign Affairs and Worship.

Governors
Floro Bogado - Formosa. Governor Formosa Province 1983-1987
Luis Beder Herrera - Campanas. Governor La Rioja Province (Argentina) 2007-2015
Deolindo Bittel - Villa Ángela. Governor Chaco Province 1963-1966 and 1973-1976
Ángel Rozas - General Pinedo. Governor Chaco Province 1995-2003
José Antonio Romero Feris - Corrientes. Governor Corrientes Province 1983-1987
Enrique Mosca - Santa Fe. Governor Santa Fe Province 1920-1924
Waldino Suárez - Santa Fe. Governor Santa Fe Province 1946-1949
Aldo Tessio - Esperanza, Santa Fe. Governor Santa Fe Province 1963-1966
Jorge Obeid - Diamante, Entre Ríos. Governor Santa Fe Province 1995-1999 y 2003-2007
Carlos Raúl Contín - Nogoyá. Governor Entre Ríos Province 1963-1966
Sergio Montiel - Concepción del Uruguay. Governor Entre Ríos Province 1983-1987 y 1999-2003
Oscar Castillo - San Fernando del Valle de Catamarca. Governor Catamarca Province 1999-2003
Francisco Pérez (governor) - San Salvador de Jujuy. Governor Mendoza Province 2011-2015
José Humberto Martiarena - San Salvador de Jujuy. Governor Jujuy Province 1966-1966
Carlos Maestro - Puerto San Julián. Governor Chubut Province 1991-1999
Arturo Puricelli - Río Gallegos. Governor Santa Cruz Province 1983-1987
Rosana Bertone - San Salvador, Entre Ríos. Governor Tierra del Fuego Province 2015-2019

Notable faculty
Ángela Romera Vera - Legal scholar and Sociology chair. First Argentine woman diplomat.
Prof. Raquel Chan. Biochemist, lead researcher in the team that developed the drought tolerant wheat and soybean seeds HB4®.

See also
List of universities in Argentina

References

External links

Science and Education in Argentina
Argentine Higher Education Official Site

 
1889 establishments in Argentina
Educational institutions established in 1889
Buildings and structures in Santa Fe, Argentina
Argentine national universities
Universities in Santa Fe Province